The 2003–04 Tetley's Bitter Rugby Union County Championship was the 104th edition of England's County Championship rugby union club competition. 

Devon won their eighth title after defeating Gloucestershire in the final.

Final

See also
 English rugby union system
 Rugby union in England

References

Rugby Union County Championship
County Championship (rugby union) seasons